Interstate 444 (I-444) is an unsigned auxiliary route of the Interstate Highway System, with both ends at I-244 in downtown Tulsa in the US state of Oklahoma. It makes up the eastern and southern sections on the square-shaped Inner Dispersal Loop.

It is signed as U.S Highway 75 (US-75), with the first half of the highway also being signed as US-64 and State Highway 51 (SH-51).

History

I-244 and I-444 initially used exit numbers in the 90s range, based on the milemarkers for I-44 in the Tulsa area and where they diverged. I-444 had four exits that were numbered 94A–94D until the highway designation became unsigned in 1995. The exit numbers were removed, leaving only the letter suffixes before later becoming unmarked.

Exit list
Exit numbers and mileposts no longer exist (see History section above for explanation of exit numbers).

References

External links

 
 Tulok.Net Side Trips - Wherefore Art Thou 94D
 OKHighways.com - Hidden Interstate 444

44-4
44-4
4
Transportation in Tulsa, Oklahoma
44-4
Transportation in Tulsa County, Oklahoma